TJL or tjl may refer to:

 TJL Motorsports, a NASCAR Camping World Truck Series team
 TJL, the IATA code for Três Lagoas Airport, Brazil
 tjl, the ISO 639-3 code for Tai Laing language, Burma